Jack Ferreira (born June 9, 1944) is an American ice hockey executive. He is currently acting as the Special Assistant to the General Manager of the NHL's Los Angeles Kings.

Jack Ferreira played for the Boston University Terriers in the mid-1960s under head coach Jack Kelley and was part of the hall-of-Fame coach's first recruiting class at BU. Named 'Mr. Magoo' by his teammates due to being legally blind, Ferreira's breakout year came as a junior in 1965 when he backstopped the Terriers to a 25-6 record and won the ECAC regular season title. Though BU would fall to Brown in the conference semifinals, preventing the Terriers from making the 1965 tournament, Ferreira had a lasting impact with his school-record 8 shutouts that still stands (As of 2016). Ferreira would finish his playing career the following year and turn to the administrative side of hockey for the rest of his career but the BU faithful would remember his stellar tenure in net and reward him with an induction into the BU athletic Hall-of-Fame in 1982.

Ferreira served as the New York Rangers' director of player development before signing a multiyear contract as the Minnesota North Stars' general manager and vice president in 1988. As part of the deal for George Gund III to sell the North Stars to a group led by Norman Green, the NHL  awarded Gund a franchise in Northern California, to which he brought Ferreira along to become the GM. Thus Ferreira was the first general manager of the San Jose Sharks during their inaugural season in 1991-92. He afterwards became the first GM of another California franchise, the Mighty Ducks of Anaheim, from 1993 to 1998. After a counterproductive season in which the Mighty Ducks failed to return to the playoffs, in 1998 Ferreira was demoted to vice president of hockey operations as Pierre Gauthier took over as GM. He left the organization in 2000 to become director of player personnel with the Atlanta Thrashers.

Awards and honors

References

External links
 

1944 births
Living people
AHCA Division I men's ice hockey All-Americans
American ice hockey administrators
American men's ice hockey goaltenders
American people of Portuguese descent
Anaheim Ducks executives
Atlanta Thrashers executives
Boston University Terriers men's ice hockey players
Calgary Flames scouts
Ice hockey people from Rhode Island
Los Angeles Kings executives
Minnesota North Stars executives
Minnesota Wild personnel
Montreal Canadiens scouts
New York Rangers executives
San Jose Sharks executives
Sportspeople from Providence, Rhode Island
Ice hockey people from Providence, Rhode Island